Bulbothrix sipmanii is a species of lichen in the family Parmeliaceae. Found in Guyana, it was formally described as a new species in 1999 by André Aptroot and Robert van Aubel. The species epithet sipmanii honours Dutch lichenologist Harrie Sipman.

References

Parmeliaceae
Lichen species
Lichens described in 1999
Lichens of Guyana
Taxa named by André Aptroot